Quién te cantará (Spanish for 'Who will sing to you') is a 2018 Spanish-French drama film written and directed by Carlos Vermut, starring Najwa Nimri and Eva Llorach. 

The film was nominated for seven Goya Awards with Llorach winning the award for Best New Actress.

Cast

Production 
Shooting locations included the provinces of Cádiz and Málaga.

Reception
Quién te cantará received positive reviews from film critics.

Jonathan Holland of The Hollywood Reporter underscored the film to be "a smart, moving homage to fandom".

Accolades

|-
| align = "center" rowspan = "25"| 2019
| 24th Forqué Awards || Best Actress in a Film || Eva Llorach ||  || 
|-
| rowspan=8 | 6th Feroz Awards
| colspan=2 | Best Drama Film
| 
| rowspan = "8" | 
|-
| Best Director
| rowspan=2 | Carlos Vermut
| 
|-
| Best Screenplay
| 
|-
| Best Actress in a Film
| Eva Llorach
| 
|-
| Best Supporting Actress
| Natalia de Molina
| 
|-
| Best Original Soundtrack
| Alberto Iglesias
| 
|-
| colspan=2 | Best Trailer
| 
|-
| colspan=2 | Best Film Poster
| 
|-
| rowspan = "3" | 11th Gaudí Awards || Best Actress || Carme Elías ||  || rowspan = "3" | 
|-
| Best Cinematography || Eduard Grau || 
|-
| Best Art Direction || Laia Ateca || 
|-
| rowspan=7 | 33rd Goya Awards
| Best Actress
| Najwa Nimri
| 
| rowspan = "7" | 
|-
| Best Supporting Actress
| Natalia de Molina
| 
|-
| Best New Actress
| Eva Llorach
| 
|-
| Best Cinematography
| Eduard Grau
| 
|-
| Best Sound
| Daniel de Zayas, Eduardo Castro, Mario González
| 
|-
| Best Costume Design
| Ana López Cobos
| 
|-
| Best Makeup and Hairstyles
| Rafael Mora, Anabel Beato
| 
|-
| 28th Actors and Actresses Union Awards || Best New Actress || Eva Llorach ||  || 
|}

See also 
 List of Spanish films of 2018
 List of French films of 2018

References

External links
 
 

2018 films
2018 drama films
Spanish drama films
2010s Spanish-language films
Apache Films films
Áralan Films films
Les Films du Worso films
Films shot in the province of Cádiz
Films shot in the province of Málaga
2010s Spanish films